Kawle may refer to:
 Kawle (surname), a surname common in India
 Kawle, Poland, a village in Poland
 Kawale Tarf Nate, a Village in Mahad taluka, Raigad district of Maharashtra state in India